Csorna is a district in central part of Győr-Moson-Sopron County. Csorna is also the name of the town where the district seat is found. The district is located in the Western Transdanubia Statistical Region.

Geography 
Csorna District borders with Mosonmagyaróvár District to the north, Győr District and Tét District to the east, Pápa District (Veszprém County) to the south, Kapuvár District to the west. The number of the inhabited places in Csorna District is 33.

Municipalities 
The district has 1 town, 2 large villages and 30 villages.
(ordered by population, as of 1 January 2012)

The bolded municipality is city, italics municipalities are large villages.

Demographics

In 2011, it had a population of 32,970 and the population density was 57/km².

Ethnicity
Besides the Hungarian majority, the main minorities are the Roma (approx. 350) and German (300).

Total population (2011 census): 32,970
Ethnic groups (2011 census): Identified themselves: 30,102 persons:
Hungarians: 29,205 (97.02%)
Gypsies: 373 (1.24%)
Others and indefinable: 524 (1.74%)
Approx. 3,000 persons in Csorna District did not declare their ethnic group at the 2011 census.

Religion
Religious adherence in the county according to 2011 census:

Catholic – 22,705 (Roman Catholic – 22,664; Greek Catholic – 34);
Evangelical – 1,987; 
Reformed – 388;
other religions – 172; 
Non-religious – 1,170; 
Atheism – 153;
Undeclared – 6,395.

See also
List of cities and towns in Hungary

References

External links
 Postal codes of the Csorna District

Districts in Győr-Moson-Sopron County